Croatia competed at the 2008 Summer Olympics in Beijing, People's Republic of China.

Medalists

Athletics

Men
Track & road events

Field events

Women
Track & road events

* Vanja Perišić of Croatia was later disqualified for failing an in-competition drugs test.

Field events

Basketball

Men's tournament
Roster

Group play

Quarterfinals

Boxing

Canoeing

Slalom

Sprint

Qualification Legend: QS = Qualify to semi-final; QF = Qualify directly to final

Cycling

Road

Gymnastics

Artistic
Men

Women

Handball

Men's tournament

Roster

Group play

Quarterfinal

Semifinal

Bronze medal game

Rowing

Men

Qualification Legend: FA=Final A (medal); FB=Final B (non-medal); FC=Final C (non-medal); FD=Final D (non-medal); FE=Final E (non-medal); FF=Final F (non-medal); SA/B=Semifinals A/B; SC/D=Semifinals C/D; SE/F=Semifinals E/F; QF=Quarterfinals; R=Repechage

Sailing

Men

Women

Open

M = Medal race; EL = Eliminated – did not advance into the medal race; CAN = Race cancelled; OCS = On the course side of the starting line

Shooting 

Men

Women

Swimming

Men

Women

Table tennis

Singles

Team

Taekwondo

Tennis

Water polo

Croatia participated in the men's tournament, where the team finished in 6th place.

Men's tournament

Roster

Group play

  is placed above  due to their head-to-head record.
All times are China Standard Time (UTC+8).

Quarterfinal

Classification round (5th–6th place)

See also
 Croatia at the 2008 Summer Paralympics

References
sports-reference

Nations at the 2008 Summer Olympics
2008
Olympics